The Butterfly Monarch is an American autogyro, designed and produced by The Butterfly LLC of Aurora, Texas.  The aircraft is supplied as a kit for amateur construction.

Design and development
The Monarch was designed to comply with the US Experimental - Amateur-built rules. It features a single main rotor, a single-seat open cockpit without a windshield, tricycle landing gear with wheel pants and a twin cylinder, liquid-cooled, two-stroke, dual-ignition  Rotax 582 engine in pusher configuration.

The tail surfaces are made from Kevlar. The tricycle landing gear is supplemented by a triple tail caster.

Optional equipment available includes a cockpit fairing with a windshield, rotor brake, auxiliary  fuel tank and an airshow smoke system.

Operational history
By December 2012 eight examples had been registered in the United States with the Federal Aviation Administration.

Specifications (Monarch)

References

External links

Official Monarch photos

2000s United States sport aircraft
Homebuilt aircraft
Single-engined pusher autogyros